Beatrice Islet Conservation Park is a protected area occupying the Beatrice Islets and adjoining intertidal areas in Nepean Bay on Kangaroo Island, South Australia.

It was dedicated in 1967 for 'conservation of wildlife habitat' replacing previous statutory protection dating back to 1909. A management philosophy for the conservation park published in 1987 supports the use of the park as a 'feeding and roosting habitat for waterbirds'. The Beatrice Islets which originally supported bushes of African boxthorn which, when cleared in either the 1960s or the 1970s, resulted in erosion and destabilisation of both islets to the extent that both were described as being 'a mudflat/cocklebed' which is submerged at high water.

 
The conservation park is classified as an IUCN Category Ia protected area.

References

External links
Beatrice Islet Conservation Park webpage on protected planet

Protected areas of Kangaroo Island
Conservation parks of South Australia
South Australian terrestrial protected areas with a  marine zone
Protected areas established in 1967
1967 establishments in Australia